Geoff Macdonald (born June 5, 1958) is the current head coach of the women's tennis team at Vanderbilt University.

Coaching career
Macdonald is the former women's tennis  head coach at Louisiana State University. Macdonald succeeded Phillip Campbell in 1988 and recorded an overall record of 50–24 in three seasons as head coach of the Lady Tigers. His teams played in one NCAA Tournament, reaching the Final 20 in 1991. He was named the SEC coach of the year in 1991. He was succeeded by Tony Minnis.

References

External links

American tennis coaches
LSU Lady Tigers tennis coaches
Living people
1958 births
Place of birth missing (living people)
Vanderbilt Commodores
American male tennis players